Walter Cobb may refer to:

Walter Cobb (department store), a department store in Sydenham, South London
USS Walter B. Cobb (APD-106), a high speed transport of the United States Navy
Walt Cobb, Canadian politician
Wally Cobb, Australian rugby union player

Cobb, Walter